Alain Louvier (born 13 September 1945) is a French composer of contemporary classical music.

Biography 
Born in Paris, Louvier studied from 1953 to 1967 at the  headed by Marcel Landowski, then from 1967 to 1970 at the Conservatoire de Paris with Henriette Puig-Roget, Olivier Messiaen, Tony Aubin, Robert Veyron-Lacroix, Norbert Dufourcq and Manuel Rosenthal. In 1968, he won the 161st and last annual Prix de Rome for musical composition. He then headed the École Nationale de Musique of Boulogne-Billancourt. From 1986 to 1991, he was the director of the Conservatoire de Paris. From 1991 to 2009, he taught music analysis and orchestration at the CNSMDP (Conservatoire) in Paris. From 2009 until 2013, he was again director of the Boulogne-Billancourt Conservatory

Louvier has composed pieces for piano, harpsichord, chamber music and orchestra. He is particularly known for his invention of a new piano technique (also used on organ and harpsichord) centered around the "aggressors": the 10 fingers, 2 palms, 2 fists and 2 forearms, treated individually. He forged a precise gestural vocabulary, and an adapted graphic syntax, involving these different elements.

Works 
 Études pour agresseurs I (1964), II (1967) for piano
 Études pour agresseurs III (1969) for modern harpsichord
 Études pour agresseurs IV (1967–1972) for two pianos
 Études pour agresseurs V (1972) for harpsichord, loudspeaker and strings
 Quintette de cuivres (Brass Quintet)
 Sonata (1966) for two pianos
 Chant des limbes (1969) for orchestra
 Quatre Préludes pour cordes 1970 for one or several pianos
 Chimère (1973) for harp, premiered in 1975
 Sempre più alto (1981) for viola and piano
 Concerto pour orchestres (1982) for orchestra and computer synthesized soundtrack
 Envols d'écailles (1986) for flute, viola and harp
 Concerto (1996) for viola and orchestra
 Solstices, 5 short pieces for high voices and piano, composed in 2004 and premiered on May 20, 2008

References 

Sources

Further reading
 "Entretien avec Alain Louvier", in Remy Campos, Le Conservatoire de Paris et son histoire, une institution en questions, Paris, L'Œil d'or, 2016,

External links 
 
 Scores , BabelScores
 "Alain Louvier", Encyclopedia Universalis
 
 "70 bougies pour Alain Louvier", ResMusica
 "Louvier Alain (1945)", Centre de documentation de la musique contemporaine (Cdmc)
 , Alain Louvier: Études pour agresseurs, book 1, étude 4

1945 births
Living people
Musicians from Paris
French classical composers
French male classical composers
20th-century French composers
21st-century French musicians
Prix de Rome for composition
Conservatoire de Paris alumni
Academic staff of the Conservatoire de Paris
Directors of the Conservatoire de Paris
20th-century French male musicians
21st-century French male musicians